Mycena renati, commonly known as the beautiful bonnet, is a species of mushroom in the family Mycenaceae. It was described by French mycologist Lucien Quélet in 1886. It has been collected in Austria, Uşak Province in Western Turkey, and Yugoslavia.

Description

References

renati
Fungi described in 1873
Fungi of Europe
Taxa named by Lucien Quélet